The Former Residence of Lu Xun in Shanghai located at 9 Continental Terrace, Lane 132, Shanyin Road, Hongkou District, Shanghai, China, is the former residence of Lu Xun (1881–1936), a noted Chinese writer. Lu lived in the house from 1933 to his death in 1936.

History
Lu settled in Shanghai in October 1927. Lu first lived in a house at 23 Jingyunli, on Donghengbin Road, Hongkou District. He then moved to Room 2093 of the Beichuan Apartments (formerly known as the Ramous Apartments) on North Sichuan Road. He moved the rented house at 9 Continental Terrace on April 11, 1933.  In Shanghai, he published a nine essay collection and a short stories collection called Old Tales Retold, and co-founded the League of Left-Wing Writers in 1930 at the Chinese Arts University on nearby Duolun Road. He translated and edited foreign works as well. Lu died in his bed on October 19, 1936, aged 55. The house was opened as a museum to the public in January 1950. It has been listed as a Protected Historical and Cultural Site of Shanghai since 1977.

Layout and nearby
The three-story building was constructed using red brick and tiles. It covers an area of 78 m2 and has a floor space of 222.72 m2. The first floor is divided into a reception room and a dining room, with the front door facing south. Lu's bedroom and study are located on the second floor. Most of his furniture is still placed as in his day. On a bedroom table is a clock that reads 5.25 am, the exact time of his death; his son occupied the third floor.

In proximity to the house are numerous other attractions dedicated to Lu Xun. These include a monument, a Memorial Hall, a park renamed in his honor, as well as his tomb.

See also
 Beijing Lu Xun Museum
 Lu Xun Native Place
 Duolun Road

References

Museums in Shanghai
Historic house museums in China
Biographical museums in China
Hongkou District
Houses completed in 1931
1931 establishments in China
Lu Xun